Frank Vacca (October 5, 1914 – August 4, 1979) was a Republican member of the Pennsylvania House of Representatives.

References

Republican Party members of the Pennsylvania House of Representatives
1914 births
1979 deaths
20th-century American politicians